Rudolf Steinboeck (1908–1996) was an Austrian theatre actor and director.  He also directed and acted in several films. He was married to the actress Aglaja Schmid.

He headed the Theater in der Josefstadt in Vienna from 1945 to 1953.

Selected filmography
 The Priest from Kirchfeld (1937)
 The Other Life (1948)
 Dear Friend (1949)

References

Bibliography 
 Fritsche, Maria. Homemade Men In Postwar Austrian Cinema: Nationhood, Genre and Masculinity . Berghahn Books, 2013.

External links 
 

1908 births
1996 deaths
Austrian film directors
Austrian male film actors
Austrian male stage actors
Actors from Baden bei Wien